John Burbank may refer to:

 John A. Burbank (1827–1905), American businessman and the fourth Governor of Dakota Territory
 John Burbank (politician), of Washington State House elections, 2008